St Andrew's Church, Kovilthottam is a historic colonial-era Roman Catholic church that is located in the Panmana–Chavara panchayat, Karunagappalli taluk, Kollam district, Kerala, India.

Masses are held in English and follow the Roman Rite liturgy.

History
It was established and first built in 1398. It was rebuilt in 1779 by the Franciscan missionary Father Yovakim de Santiago.  The church is also a parish church, part of the Diocese of Quilon, established in the 14th century.

The 1779 church was built in the Portuguese Colonial style, and dedicated to St Andrew. The church building was renovated in the 2000s, and subsequently consecrated by the Bishop of the Roman Catholic Diocese of Quilon, Stanley Roman in 2006.

Setting
Kovilthottam is a small coastal village and a port, between Chavara T.S. canal part of the Kerala backwaters and Arabian sea to its west, it is approachable from Chavara from the iron footbridge. The Church is a popular pilgrimage and tourist destination of Chavara.

Former vicars
Rev. Fr. Yoachim D'santiago - 1770
Rev. Fr. Francis Alvaras - 1779
Rev. Fr. Louis Ker Netto - 1881
Rev. Fr. Mathai Nelluvelil Kathanar - (1881 - 1883)
Rev. Fr. John Kathanar - (1883 - 1884)
Rev. Fr. Michael Kathanar - (1884 - 1887)
Rev. Fr. Thoma Kathanar - (1887 - 1899)
Rev. Fr. John a. Netto - (1899 - 1901)
Rev. Fr. Michael Jackson - (1901 - 1905)
Rev. Fr. Joseph Peres - (1905 - 1910)
Rev. Fr. M. David Fernandez - (1910 - 1911)
Rev. Fr. Peter Morris - (1911)
Rev. Fr. Francis Fernandez - (1911 - 1913)
Rev. Fr. John A. Netto - (1914 - 1917)
Rev. Fr. Leene B. Miranda - (1917 - 1919)
Rev. Fr. George Karikuzhi - (1919)
Rev. Fr. Bernard benjamine fernandez - (1919 - 1923)
Rev. Fr. Simon s. gonzago - (1923 - 1933)
Rev. Fr. Mark P. Fernandez - (1933 - 1934)
Rev. Fr. Marceline Morris - (1934 - 1939)
Rev. Fr. Bernard Benjamine Fernandez - (1939 - 1946)
Rev. Fr. Valerian M. Fernandez - (1946 - 1956)
Rev. Fr. Michael M. Netto - (1956 - 1968)
Rev. Fr. Elias Varghese - (1968 - 1972)
Rev. Fr. Christepher Morris - (1972 - 1984)
Rev. Fr. Christy Daniel - (1984 - 1987)
Rev. Fr. Joseph Morris - (1984 - 1987)
Rev. Fr. K. J. Jesudas - (1987 - 1990)
Rev. Fr. Andrew Eugene - (1990 - 1992)
Rev. Fr. Sefernos Sebastian - (1992 - 1997)
Rev. Fr. John G. Fernandez - (1997 - 1998)
Rev. Fr. Hubert Fernandez - (1998 - 1999)
Rev. Fr. Antony John - (1999 - 2003)
Rev. Fr. Joseph Detto Fernandez - (2003)
Rev. Fr. Dionysius C. Antony - (2003 - 2006)
Rev. Fr. Milton G. - (2006 - 2008)
Rev. Fr. Franklin Francis - (2008 - 2013)
Rev. Fr. Arun J. Aradan- (2013 - 2014)
Rev. Fr. Shani Francis - (2014 -   2017)       )
Rev. Fr. Abel Lucious (2018- 2020)
Rev. Fr. Milton George (2020- to present)

References

External links
Official St Andrew's Church, Kovilthottam website

1398 establishments in Asia
Roman Catholic churches completed in 1398
Churches in Kollam district
Colonial Kerala
Franciscan churches in India
Roman Catholic churches in Kerala
Roman Catholic churches completed in 1779
18th-century Roman Catholic church buildings in India
Religious organizations established in the 1390s
Portuguese in Kerala
Portuguese colonial architecture in India
14th-century establishments in India
14th-century Roman Catholic church buildings in India